Kaji may refer to:

Kaji (surname), a Japanese surname
Kaji (poet), an 18th century Japanese poet
Kaji (Nepal), a title and position used by Nepalese nobility during the Shah rule of Nepal
Kaji Station, a railway station in Shibata, Niigata, Japan
KAJI-LP, a low-power radio station (95.3 FM) licensed to serve Palm Desert, California, United States
Kaji (mythology), metal-working spirits in Georgian mythology

See also
 Kaiji (disambiguation)
 Kasi (disambiguation)
 Kazi (disambiguation)